Geόrgii Chόrnyi (born 	September 14, 1937 in Ukraine) is a Ukrainian aeronautical engineer who was awarded a State Prize of Ukraine in Science and Technology in 2018. He  has also written a history of early Ukraine, and received the Mykhailo Chabanivskyi Ukrainian literary Prize in 2015.

Early life 
Geόrgii Chόrnyi (:uk:Чорний Георгій Петрович) was born in a peasant family on September 14, 1937 in the Dubόvi Hriády village, on territory of the former Orilian palanka (:uk:Орільська паланка) -  one of 10 regions of the Сossack State of Zaporizhzhya. Evidently, his nearest ancestors were Zaporozhian Cossacks, among which the last name Chόrnyi was most common.

Engineering and scientific activity
Since 1965, he has worked at the State Kyiv design bureau "Luch" (:uk:Луч (конструкторське бюро)), and has written a book about it. He was awarded order "The Badge  of Honour" (1982) and honorary title "Honoured Worker of Ukraine in Science and Technology" (1993) and  a State Prize of Ukraine in Science and Technology (2018) for his work at the design bureau on rockets and defensive hardware. At the same time, he was associate professor in the National Aviation University (2002-2012), and published  a textbook Автоматизовані системи контролю літальних апаратів, with the recommendation of Department of Education and Science of Ukraine.

Literary and public activity 
He has at the same time studied sources on the language, genetics, history, and culture of Ukrainians. The results of his research on linguistic-historical themes were printed in newspapers: "Holos Ukrayiny",  "Vechirnii Kyiv", "Khreshchatic", "Ukrayina moloda", "Literaturna Ukrayina", and others. Against the resistance of the Kyiv municipal administration, but with public support, he brought about the naming of a new metro station by the annalistic name "Dorohόzhichy", and as a result of that got from journalists the honorary title: "godfather" of the name "Dorohόzhichy". Results of his researches about early prehistoric Kyiv and the historical way of the Ukrainians, became the basis for his book Київ досвітній (2014), for which he was awarded the title of Laureate of the Ukrainian literary Prize of the name of Mykhajlo Chabanivskyi. The publishing house "Glagoslav Publications" (Great Britain) published his e-book Стародавня Україна і ранній Київ  in 2016, intended for the readers in the Ukrainian diaspora.

References

External links 
 Гай, Наталка. "Таємниці прадавнього Києва". [Gai, Natalka. "The mysteries of the ancient Kyiv"], Khreshchatic, Kyiv, 6 November 2014. (Ukrainian). . Retrieved on 15 October 2018.
 Дикань, Костянтин. "Ківі, Кіфа, Кіафа, Кіаса …І це все — Київ". [Dikan, Kostjantin. "Kivi, Kifa, Kiafa, Kiasa … And all this – Kyiv"]. Ukraina moloda, Kyiv, 9 September 2015. (Ukrainian).Retrieved on 15 October 2018.
 https://www.youtube.com/watch?v=E2_gOIYir7M. Книга Георгія Чорного "Київ досвітній" [The book Kyiv at dawn by Georgii Chornyi](Ukrainian).Retrieved on 21 October 2018.

1937 births
Living people
21st-century Ukrainian historians
20th-century Ukrainian engineers
National Aerospace University – Kharkiv Aviation Institute alumni
Laureates of the State Prize of Ukraine in Science and Technology